Morley Top railway station served the town of Morley, West Yorkshire, England, from 1857 to 1969 on the Leeds, Bradford and Halifax Junction Railway.

History 
The station opened as Morley on 10 October 1857 by the Leeds, Bradford and Halifax Junction Railway. Its name was changed to Morley Top on 2 March 1951 to avoid confusion with another station of the same name. The station closed to passengers on 2 January 1961 and closed to goods in May 1969. The station master's house still survives.

References

External links 

Disused railway stations in West Yorkshire
Railway stations opened in 1857
Railway stations closed in 1961
1857 establishments in England
1969 disestablishments in England
Railway stations in Great Britain opened in the 19th century